The 1921–22 Washington Huskies men's basketball team represented the University of Washington for the  NCAA college basketball season. Led by second-year head coach Hec Edmundson, the Huskies were members of the Pacific Coast Conference and played their home games on campus in Seattle, Washington.

Washington opened the season with twelve wins, but lost five of their last six.

The PCC became an eight-team league this year with the addition of USC and Idaho; the Vandals won the season title, and repeated the next year.

References

External links
Sports Reference – Washington Huskies: 1921–22 basketball season
Washington Huskies men's basketball media guide (2009–10) – History

Washington Huskies men's basketball seasons
Washington Huskies
Washington
Washington